HMS Reserve was a 50-gun fourth rate ship of the line of the Royal Navy, built at Deptford Dockyard and launched on 18 March 1704.

Reserve was renamed HMS Sutherland in 1716, and converted to serve as a hospital ship in 1741. Sutherland was broken up in 1754.

Notes

References

Lavery, Brian (2003) The Ship of the Line - Volume 1: The development of the battlefleet 1650-1850. Conway Maritime Press. .

Ships of the line of the Royal Navy
1700s ships